The 2001 Georgia Southern Eagles football team represented the Georgia Southern University as a member of the Southern Conference (SoCon) during the 2001 NCAA Division I-AA football season. Led by Paul Johnson in his fifth and final year as head coach, the Eagles compiled an overall record of 12–2 with a mark of 7–1 in conference play, sharing the SoCon title with Furman. Georgia Southern advanced to the NCAA Division I-AA Football Championship playoffs, where they defeated  in the first round and Appalachian State in the quarterfinals before falling to Furman in the semifinals. Eagles played their home games at Paulson Stadium in Statesboro, Georgia.

Schedule

References

Georgia Southern
Georgia Southern Eagles football seasons
Southern Conference football champion seasons
Georgia Southern Eagles football